Hunt City Township is one of eleven townships in Jasper County, Illinois, USA.  As of the 2010 census, its population was 282 and it contained 126 housing units.

Geography

Unincorporated towns
 Brookville at 
 Hunt City at 
(This list is based on USGS data and may include former settlements.)

Adjacent townships
 Grandville Township (north)
 Licking Township, Crawford County (northeast)
 Oblong Township, Crawford County (east)
 Willow Hill Township (south)
 Wade Township (west)
 Crooked Creek Township (northwest)

Cemeteries
The township contains these five cemeteries: Baily, Brockville, Mattison/Madison, Mound and Sand Rock.

Major highways
  Illinois Route 49

Demographics

School districts
 Jasper County Community Unit School District 1
 Oblong Community Unit School District 4

Political districts
 Illinois's 19th congressional district
 State House District 108
 State Senate District 54

Notable residents
 Burl Ives was born in Hunt City Township, and is buried there at Mound Cemetery.

References
 
 United States Census Bureau 2007 TIGER/Line Shapefiles
 United States National Atlas

External links
 City-Data.com
 Illinois State Archives

Townships in Jasper County, Illinois
1901 establishments in Illinois
Populated places established in 1901
Townships in Illinois